James Byron Reed (January 2, 1881 – April 27, 1935) was a U.S. Representative from Arkansas' former 6th congressional district.

Born near Lonoke, Arkansas, Reed attended the rural schools of his county and Hendrix College, a Methodist institution in Conway, Arkansas. In 1906, he graduated from the law department of the University of Arkansas at Fayetteville and was admitted to the bar that same year. A lawyer in private practice, he was a member of the Arkansas House of Representatives in the 1907 session. From 1912 to 1916, Reed he was the prosecuting attorney of the 17th Judicial District Court.

Reed was elected as a Democrat to the Sixty-eighth Congress to fill the vacancy caused by the death of United States Representative Lewis E. Sawyer. He was reelected to the Sixty-ninth and Seventieth Congresses (October 6, 1923 - March 3, 1929).
He was an unsuccessful candidate for renomination in 1928, having been unseated by David Delano Glover, a lawyer from Malvern, Arkansas.

Reed died on April 27, 1935, in Little Rock and is interred at Lonoke Cemetery in his native Lonoke.

References

1881 births
1935 deaths
People from Lonoke County, Arkansas
Democratic Party members of the United States House of Representatives from Arkansas
Democratic Party members of the Arkansas House of Representatives
District attorneys in Arkansas
Arkansas lawyers
20th-century American politicians
20th-century American lawyers
Hendrix College alumni
University of Arkansas alumni